Winter Light is a compilation album by Greek keyboardist and composer Yanni, released on the Private Music label in 1999. It peaked at #3 on Billboard's "Top New Age Albums" chart in the same year.

Content
This album is a collection of popular songs by Yanni from many of his albums including Optimystique, Keys to Imagination, Out of Silence, Chameleon Days, Reflections of Passion, Dare to Dream and In My Time. This compilation is a remastered recordings.

Track listing

References

External links
Official Website

Yanni albums
1999 compilation albums